The Embassy of Sweden in Paris is Sweden's diplomatic mission in France.

Buildings

Chancery
In the 1910s, the chancery building was located at 58 Avenue Marceau in Paris. In the late 1930s, the chancery moved around the corner to 25 rue de Bassano and the residence was still at 58 Avenue Marceau. In the late 1960s, the chancery moved to 66 rue
Boissière in the 16th arrondissement. In the 1970s, the consulate department was located at 125 Avenue des Champs-Élysées.

Since 1974, the chancery and residence is located at 17 rue Barbet de Jouy at Rive Gauche in the 7th arrondissement. The embassy site was bought in 1959 by the Swedish state for 2 million Swedish krona. A Swedish architect was first hired to draw up a proposal for an embassy and ambassadorial residence. When the drawings were not accepted by the French licensing authority, it was instead a Frenchman who came up with the final proposal. The architect André Malizard's proposal has been described as "functional architecture from the 1970s". In 1974, it was possible to move into the new embassy. The facility consists of an office, residence and staff housing and the interior is managed by the Ministry for Foreign Affairs' property department itself.

In 2005, the National Property Board of Sweden carried out a major rebuild and modernization of the chancery. The top floor with cell offices was converted into open office space, meeting rooms and staff rooms with kitchenettes. Around the top floor runs a terrace which is now accessible to all staff. The ground floor was adapted for accessibility and the large conference room was modernized with access to the garden. In 2009, the OECD delegation moved into the premises and in 2011 the consular department was moved down to the ground floor. At the beginning of 2015, an energy saving project was carried out at the facility. New ventilation ducts and a new heating system were installed.

Residence
From at least the 1910s to the late 1930s, the residence was located at the same address as the chancery, at 58 Avenue Marceau. The chancery moved to another address around the corner in the late 1930s. Since 1974, the residence is co-located with the chancery at 17 rue Barbet de Jouy at Rive Gauche in the 7th arrondissement. The residence was renovated in 2015. New ventilation ducts and a new heating system were installed. All windows and window doors in the residence have been given modern energy glass.

Heads of Mission

See also
 France–Sweden relations

References

External links
 Embassy of Sweden in Paris

Paris
France–Sweden relations
Sweden